Haustorius is a genus of amphipods in the family Haustoriidae. There are about six described species in Haustorius.

Species
These six species belong to the genus Haustorius:
 Haustorius algeriensis Mulot, 1968
 Haustorius arenarius (Slabber, 1769)
 Haustorius canadensis Bousfield, 1962
 Haustorius jayneae Foster & LeCroy, 1991
 Haustorius mexicanus Ortiz, Cházaro-Olvera & Winfield, 2001
 Haustorius orientalis Bellan-Santini, 2005

References

Further reading

External links

 

Gammaridea
Articles created by Qbugbot